First published in 1932, A Child of the Revolution is chronologically the last book in the Scarlet Pimpernel series by Baroness Orczy.

Plot
During one return home, Sir Percy tells the story of André Vallon, a young Jacobin, to the Prince of Wales. André, wishing to revenge himself on a despotic seigneur, uses the Jacobins' rise to force the seigneur's daughter to marry him. Once wed, they come to love each other, only to have the old seigneur denounce André in an attempt to free his daughter.

1932 British novels
Scarlet Pimpernel books
Novels by Baroness Emma Orczy
Cassell (publisher) books
English-language novels